Nicholas Mirzoeff is a visual culture theorist and professor in the Department of Media, Culture and Communication at New York University. He is best known for his work developing the field of visual culture and for his many books and his widely used textbook on the subject. He was also Deputy Director of the International Association for Visual Culture from 2012-2016 and organized its first conference in 2012. Mirzoeff holds a BA degree from Oxford University and studied for his PhD at the University of Warwick.

Affiliations
 2007–present: Journal of Photography and Culture, Editorial Board Member
 2005: Visiting Canterbury Fellow, University of Canterbury, New Zealand
 2004–2007: British Film Institute Television Classics, Editorial Board Member
 2002–present: Situation Analysis, Editorial Board Member
 2002: Visiting Fellow, Sterling and Francine Clark Art Institute, Williamstown MA
 2002: Leverhulme Visiting Professor, University of Nottingham, UK
 2001–present: The Journal of Visual Culture, Editorial Board Member
 2001: Visiting Fellow, Humanities Research Center, Australian National University, Canberra, Australia
 2001: William Andrews Clark Memorial Library, UCLA, Visiting Fellow
 2000–2005: Visual Culture Caucus, Founder and Co-President
 2000–2005: College Art Association, Board of Directors
 1996: Postdoctoral Fellow, Humanities Institute, Stony Brook University
 1994: Huntington Library, Pasadena, CA, Visiting Fellow
 1993: Yale Center for British Art, Visiting Fellow
 1992: J. Paul Getty Center, Postdoctoral Fellow in the History of Art and the Humanities
 1991: NEH Postdoctoral Fellow, UCLA Center for 17th and 18th Century Studies

Awards 
 2006: Steinhardt Challenge Grant

Publications and bibliography
 The Appearance of Black Lives Matter (Miami: NAME Publications, 2017)
 How to See the World (London: Pelican, 2015)
 The Right to Look: A Counterhistory of Visuality (Duke University Press, 2011)
 Seinfeld: A Critical Study of the Series (British Film Institute, 2007)
 Watching Babylon: the War in Iraq and Global Visual Culture (Routledge, 2005) translated into Italian as Guardare la Guerra (Rome: Meltemi, 2005)
 (as editor) Diaspora and Visual Culture: Representing Africans and Jews (London and New York: Routledge, 2001)
 An Introduction to Visual Culture (London and New York: Routledge, 1999) translations into Italian, Spanish, Korean and Chinese. Second fully revised edition, 2008.  
 (as editor) The Visual Culture Reader (London and New York: Routledge, 1998) Second fully revised edition, 2002. 
 Bodyscape: Art, Modernity and the Ideal Figure (London and New York: 1995) translated into Korean
 Silent Poetry: deafness, sign and visual culture in modern France (Princeton and London: Princeton University Press, 1995)

References

External links
Visual Culture in a Time of War, Mirzoeff's former blog
Nicholas Mirzoeff's website

Year of birth missing (living people)
Living people
New York University faculty